Troma Entertainment was founded out of the rubble of Lloyd Kaufman's Armor Films in 1974 as a production company. In 1995, Kaufman and vice president Michael Herz formed Troma Team Video who would handle all of their distribution instead of going through a third party. Since 1995, they have been releasing Troma titles (including titles the company has bought since being formed and a large collection of older classics with The Roan Group) on DVD and virally. They started re-releasing their films on Blu-ray in 2010.

This is a list of films currently being distributed by Troma Team Video.

1920s 
The Vagabond Lover

1930s 
Behind Office Doors
Billy the Kid Returns
Bird of Paradise
Blue Steel
The Broken Melody
Days of Jesse James
Dixiana
The Fighting Westerner
Fisherman's Warf
The Gorilla
Hell Town
His Private Secretary
Illegal
The Kennel Murder Case
Kept Husbands
The Lady Refuses
The Last Frontier
The Legion of Missing Men
Light of Western Stars
Lonely Wives
The Lucky Texan
The Milky Way
Millie
The Mysterious Mr. Wong
Nancy Drew, Reporter
The New Adventures of Tarzan
Of Human Bondage
Paradise Canyon
Rawhide Terror
The Secret of Dr. Kildare
Silver Horde
Sins of the Children
Something To Sing About
Tarzan the Fearless
Tarzan's Revenge
They Made Me a Criminal
Undersea Kingdom
Way Down South
West of the Divide
Where Trails Divide
White Zombie
Zorro Rides Again
Zorro's Fighting Legion

1940s 
Adventure in Iraq
Africa Screams
Angel on My Shoulder
Apache Rose
The Ape
Blood on the Sun
Bowery at Midnight
British Intelligence
Captain Kidd
The Corpse Vanishes
Dead Men Walk
The Devil Bat
Dick Tracy, Detective
Dick Tracy Meets Gruesome
Dick Tracy vs. Cueball
Dick Tracy's Dilemma
Enemy of Women
Flash Gordon Conquers the Universe
Hands Across the Border
Helldorado
In Old Cheyenne
Invisible Ghost
Kid Dynamite
King of the Cowboys
Lady Gangster
Lady of Burlesque
The Monster Maker
Nabonga
The Perils of Paulie
Roll on Texas Moon
That Uncertain Feeling
The Time of Your Life
Underground
Zorro's Black Whip

1950s 
Albert Schweitzer
The Bat
The Big Trees
Carnival Story
D.O.A.
The Hitch-Hiker
Indestructible Man
Jack and the Beanstalk
Last Time I Saw Paris
The Painted Hills
Patterns
Radar Men from the Moon
Rage at Dawn
Suddenly
Indiscretion of an American Wife
Three Guys Named Mike

1960s 
The Amazing Transparent Man
The Christmas Kid
Drums of Tabu
The Fat Spy
The Girl Who Returned
Madigan's Millions
Psycho A-Go Go
Pyro - The Phantom of the Ferris Wheel
Scream, Baby, Scream
Shark!
Sweet Sound of Death
The Wedding Party
A Witch Without a Broom
Zulu

1970s 
Acting Out
Albino
Alien Thunder
The Battle of Love's Return
Big Gus, What's the Fuss?
Blood Sucking Freaks
The Butchers
California Fever
The Capture of Bigfoot
Centerfold Girls
Croaked: Frog Monster from Hell
Cry Uncle!
Demented Death Farm Massacre
The Divine Obsession
East End Hustle
Feelin' Up
Fore Play
The G.I. Executioner
Garden of the Dead
Ginger in the Morning
God's Gun
Hanging Woman
Hot Summer in Barefoot County
Innocents From Hell
Mad Dog Morgan
The Newcomers
Crazed
No Substitute for Victory
Pigs
Preacherman
Project Kill
Seduction of a Nerd
Sizzle Beach, U.S.A.
Squeeze Play!
Sugar Cookies
Sweet Savior
Video Vixens

1980s

1980 
Beyond Evil
The Children
Escape From Hell
Mother's Day
Nightmare Never Ends

1981 
Croaked: Frog Monster from Hell
Graduation Day
Great White Death
Waitress!

1982 
Circle of Two
Curse of the Cannibal Confederates
Dreams Come True
Ferocious Female Freedom Fighters
The Last Horror Film
Nightbeast
Stuck on You!
When Nature Calls

1983 
Carnage
The First Turn-On!
Frightmare
Monster in the Closet

1984 
Combat Shock
Ellie
Sexy Timetrip Ninjas
The Toxic Avenger
New Gladiators
Zombie Island Massacre
That's My Baby! (1984 film)

1985 
I Was a Teenage TV Terrorist
Igor and the Lunatics
Reel Horror
Screamplay
Star Worms II: Attack of the Pleasure Pods
The Stabilizer

1986 
Class of Nuke 'Em High
Hollywood Zap!
Nightmare Weekend
Girls School Screamers 
Play Dead
S&M Hunter

1987 
Blood Hook
Chillers
Deadly Daphne's Revenge
Jonathan of the Night
Lust for Freedom
Mommy's Epitaph
The Newlydeads
Plutonium Baby
Redneck Zombies
Skeleton Coast
Story of a Junkie
Surf Nazis Must Die

1988 
Bloodspell
Contra Conspiracy
Death by Dialogue
Dr. Hackenstein
Evil Clutch
Mirror of Death
Rabid Grannies
Ragin' Cajun
Troma's War
Witchcraft

1989 
Beware! Children at Play
Blades
Dead Dudes in the House
Fortress of Amerikkka
Invasion for Flesh & Blood
Mr. Robbie
Stuff Stephanie in the Incinerator
Tale of Two Sisters
The Toxic Avenger Part II
The Toxic Avenger Part III: The Last Temptation of Toxie
They Call Me Macho Woman!
Video Demons Do Psychotown

1990s

1990 
Dead Dudes in the House
Def by Temptation
Fertilize the Blaspheming Bombshell
Getting Lucky
Luther the Geek
Maniac Nurses Find Ecstasy
Nerds of a Feather
No Way Back
A Nymphoid Barbarian in Dinosaur Hell
Sgt. Kabukiman N.Y.P.D.
Strangest Dreams: Invasion of the Space Preachers
There's Nothing Out There
Time Barbarians
Twisted Justice

1991 
Body Parts
Cause of Death
Class of Nuke 'Em High 2: Subhumanoid Meltdown
Cybernator
Horror of the Humongous Hungry Hungan
Killer Nerd
Prime Target
Tomcat Angels
Toxic Crusaders
Vegas in Space
Where Evil Lives
Wizards of the Demon Sword

1992 
American History
Bride of Killer Nerd
Fraternity Demon
State of Mind
Witchcraft 4: The Virgin Heart

1993 
Cannibal! The Musical
Death Dancers
Eye of the Stranger
Space Zombie Bingo
Teenage Catgirls in Heat
The Troma System
Tuesday Never Comes

1994 
Beg!
Class of Nuke 'Em High 3: The Good, the Bad and the Subhumanoid
Dragon Fury
Flesh Eaters from Outer Space
House of the Rising
Witchcraft 666: The Devil's Mistress

1995 
Blondes Have More Guns
Decampitated
Digital Prophet
Jurassic Women
Mommy

1996 
Go To Hell
The Imitators
Killer Condom
Macabre Pair of Shorts
Tight Spot
Tromeo & Juliet
Vegas High Stakes
Vendetta

1997 
Blood Sisters of Lesbian Sin
Bugged!
Buttcrack!
Dog Years
Hellinger
Legend of the Chupacabra
Mommy 2: Mommy's Day

1998 
Baconhead
The Chosen One: Legend of the Raven
Fag Hag
Jefftowne
Lost in Hollywood
Pep Squad
Terror Firmer
Sucker: The Vampire
Tainted
Viewer Discretion Advised

1999 
Alien Blood
Back Road Diner
Fatty Drives the Bus
The Hall Monitor
Nightfall
Sergio Lapel's Drawing Blood
Shakespeare in...and Out
Viral Assassins

2000s

2000 
Ángel Negro
Citizen Toxie: The Toxic Avenger IV
Dumpster Baby
Eve's Beach Fantasy
Left-Overs
The Rowdy Girls
Superstarlet A.D.
Vegas High Stakes

2001 
Farts of Darkness: The Making of Terror Firmer
Outlaw Prophet
Rockabilly Vampire: Burnin' Love
Suicide
Real Time: Siege at Lucas Street Market

2002 
All the Love You Cannes!
Apocalypse Soon: The Making of Citizen Toxie

2003 
Bazaar Bizarre
Coming Distractions
Doggie Tails
Parts of the Family
Tales from the Crapper
The Wounded
Zombiegeddon

2004 
Emily
The Incredible Torture Trio
LolliLove
Marijuana's Revenge
Offensive Behaviour
The Thick Brown Line

2005 
Actium Maximus: War of the Alien Dinosaurs
Belcebú: Diablos Lesbos
Coons! Night of the Bandits of the Night
Devoured: The Legend of Alfred Packer
Eyes of the Chameleon
Hick Trek 2: The Next Aggravation
Make Your Own Damn Movie!
Mike Jacobs' Explosive Golf
No Substitute for Victory: From Vietnam to Iraq
Pot Zombies
Rock 'n' Roll Space Patrol Action is Go!
Slaughter Party
Space Daze
Virgin Beasts

2006 
Big Foot
Blood Oath
Bloodspit
Cyxork 7
Debbie Rochon Confidential - My Years In Tromaville Exposed
Electric Apricot: Quest for Festeroo
The Demons Among Us
The Evolved Part 1
I Need to Lose Ten Pounds
Meat Weed Madness
Poultrygeist: Night of the Chicken Dead
Special Needs
Yeti: A Love Story

2007 
Blood, Boobs & Beast
Crazy Animal
Jack to the Max
Klown Kamp Massacre
Meat Weed America
A Nocturne: Night of the Vampire
Street Team Massacre

2008 
Bloodspit
Cars 3
Dead Eyes Open
Lazer Ghosts 2: Return to Laser Cove
Poultry in Motion: Truth is Stranger than Chicken
The Seduction of Dr. Fugazzi
Shameless, Tasteless
Splendor and Wisdom
Vanity Insanity

2009 
10 Things Every Golfer Should Know
The Chainsaw Sally Show
Cool Guys
Dark Nature
Direct Your Own Damn Movie!
The Ghost of Marquis de Sade
Grim
Heavy Mental: A Rock-n-Roll Blood Bath
Jessicka Rabid
The Killer Bra
Killer Yacht Party
My Best Maniac
Penisella
Post Traumatic: An American Nightmare
Purge
Zombie Werewolves Attack!

2010s

2010 
Blood Junkie
Homeless Joe
LA
Mr. Hollywood
Obsession Letters to David Lynch
Sexy Workout
Spaceman
Superstar
Surfin' in the USA
The Taint
What is Art?

2011 
Astron-6
Father's Day
LA Maniac
Mr. Bricks: A Heavy Metal Murder Musical
Not Another B Movie
Produce Your Own Damn Movie!
Psycho Sleepover
The Secret of the Magic Mushrooms
Teenape vs. the Nazi Monster Apocalypse

2012 
Attack of the Tromaggot
Doomsday County
Frankensluts

2013 
Another Space Daze
Bikini Swamp Girl Massacre
Breeding Farm
Return to Nuke 'Em High: Volume 1

2014 
30 Girls 30 Days
Banana Motherfucker
The Deviants
Mutant Blast
Occupy Cannes!
Sell Your Own Damn Movie

2015 
Theatre of the Deranged II

2016 
B.C. Butcher
Hectic Knife
Return to Return to Nuke 'Em High AKA Volume 2
Spidarlings

2017 
The Middle Finger

2020s

2020 
Friend of the World

Troma Blu-Ray 
Sugar Cookies (1973)
Bloodsucking Freaks (1976)
Mother's Day (1980)
Graduation Day (1981)
The Last Horror Film (1982)
The Toxic Avenger (1984)
Class of Nuke 'Em High (1986)
Rabid Grannies (1988)
Troma's War (1988)
Toxic Avenger Part II (1989)
Toxic Avenger Part III: The Last Temptation of Toxie (1989)
Sgt. Kabukiman N.Y.P.D. (1990)
Tromeo & Juliet (1996)
Citizen Toxie: The Toxic Avenger Part IV (2000)
Poultrygeist: Night of the Chicken Dead (2006)
Dark Nature (2009)
The Taint (2010)
Father's Day (2011)
Return to Nuke 'Em High Volume 1 (2013)
Extreme Jukebox (2015)
Theatre of the Deranged II (2015)
Spidarlings (2016)

Specials

The Tromasterpiece Collection 
Cannibal! The Musical (vol. 1)
Redneck Zombies (vol. 2)
The Last Horror Film (vol. 3)
Combat Shock (vol. 4)
Mad Dog Morgan (vol. 5)
Troma's War (vol. 6)

See also 
Troma Entertainment
List of Troma films
List of horror films
List of fantasy films
Lists of science fiction films

External links 
Troma's own movie database

Lists of films by studio